Homestead Township is a township in Chase County, Kansas, United States.  As of the 2000 census, its population was 52.

Geography

Communities
The township contains the following settlements:
 Ghost town of Homestead.

Cemeteries
The township contains the following cemeteries:
 Homestead.

References

Further reading

External links
 Chase County Website
 City-Data.com
 Chase County Maps: Current, Historic, KDOT

Townships in Chase County, Kansas
Townships in Kansas